The 1947 Virginia Cavaliers football team was an American football team that represented the University of Virginia as an independent during the 1947 college football season. In its second season under head coach Art Guepe, the team compiled a 7–3 record and outscored opponents by a total of 370 to 261. The team played its home games at Scott Stadium in Charlottesville, Virginia.

Schedule

References

Virginia
Virginia Cavaliers football seasons
Virginia Cavaliers football